Puhovo may refer to:

 Puhovo, Serbia, a village near Lučani
 Puhovo, Croatia, a village near Dugo Selo